Notebook is a style of writing where people jot down what they have thought or heard at the spur of moment. The contents of a notebook are unorganized, and the number of subjects covered in a notebook are unlimited: a paragraph of autobiography can be followed immediately by one on astronomy or one on history. 

Some famous authors are also famous for the notebooks they left.   

There are writers who earned their posthumous fame solely by their notebooks, such as the German scientist and humorous writer Georg Lichtenberg. He called his notebooks "waste books," using the English book-keeping term.

The notebooks of scientists, such as those of Michael Faraday and Charles Darwin, can reveal the development of their scientific theories. On the other hand, the notebooks used by scientists for recording their experiments are called lab notebooks.

The notebooks used by artists are usually referred to as sketchbooks, which may contain more than sketches. Leonardo da Vinci's notebooks contain his writings on painting, sculpture, architecture, anatomy, mining, inventions and music, as well as his sketches, his grocery lists and the names of people who owed him money.

In Chinese literature, "notebook" or biji is a distinct genre, and has a broader meaning.

Notes

Non-fiction genres
Note-taking
Notebooks